Brindavana is a 2013 Indian Kannada romantic comedy film starring Darshan, Karthika Nair (in her first and only Kannada film to date) and Milana Nagaraj and also featuring Saikumar and Sampath Raj. A remake of the 2010 Telugu film Brindavanam, it was directed by K Madesh and produced by Suresh Gowda for Sri Seethabaireshwara Productions. The soundtrack was composed by V. Harikrishna and the cinematography was by Ramesh Babu.

The film was later dubbed into Hindi as Ghayal: The Power Man by Sumeet Arts in 2014.

Plot 
The main story of the film is about two step brothers, played by Saikumar and Sampath Raj. They are rival big shots in their village. Karthika Nair and Milana Nagaraj play cousins of theirs. Karthika Nair stays in the village, but Milana Nagaraj relocates for her studies to the city where Darshan lives. The two meet when he helps her, become friends, and eventually fall in love.

Meanwhile, Karthika Nair's marriage is arranged with some goonda whom she does not want to marry. She asks Milana Nagaraj to help her; she in turn asks Darshan to help. He goes to the village intending to prevent the marriage using tricks. He ends up solving many problems in the village and finally putting an end to the rivalry between Saikumar and Sampath Raj, leading to a happy ending.

Cast

 Darshan as Krishna
 Karthika Nair as Bhoomi
 Milana Nagaraj as Madhu
 Saikumar as Madhu's Father
 Sampath Raj as Bhoomi's father
 Ajay as Varadha, Bhoomi's cousin
 Jai Jagadish
 Doddanna
 Sangeetha
 Sarath Babu 
 Nirosha as Madhu's Mother
 Kuri Prathap
 Prakash Heggodu 
 Sadhu Kokila 
 Veena Sundar 
 Geetha 
 Killer Venkatesh 
 Bahubali Prabhakar 
 Mohan Juneja 
 Stunt Siddu 
 Ramesh Babu

Production
Principal shooting for Brindavana formally began on 16 February 2013, which happened to be the birthday of lead actor Darshan. Actors Ambareesh and V. Ravichandran were the chief guests invited for the launch at the Kanteerava Studios in Bangalore. The film marks the first Kannada production set to shoot in Iceland.

Casting
While Darshan and Karthika had the lead roles, the second female lead role was first offered to Vedhika Kumar; Malayalam actress Muktha replaced her in the role, and still later it went to newcomer Milana Nagaraj.

Release 
Brindavana was released on 26 September in more than 190 theaters; the box office over 50 days was around 17 crore. Some other films, including Sakkare, Sweety Nanna Jodi, and Dilwala postponed their release to avoid clashing with it.

The satellite telecast rights were offered up to a price of 5.40 crore, making it the second highest-priced Kannada-language film.

Critical reception 
A critic from The Times of India wrote that the director "has excellently mixed comedy, action, sentiments and romance with rich lively narration that perfectly suits the character of Darshan".

Twenty-five days celebration 
On the 25th day after the film's release there was a grand celebration in Gandhinagar Narthaki theatre (the main theatre of Brindavana). A blood donation camp was held, with Darshan, Milana, director Madesh, and others in attendance. Darshan's fans announced some days before on social networking sites that he would be there; there was such a large crowd that police came to disperse them and blocked all traffic. The theater was damaged; producer Srinivasamurthy paid the resulting costs.

Soundtrack
The music was composed by V. Harikrishna and released by D-Beats.

References

External links

2013 films
2013 romantic comedy films
Indian romantic comedy films
Kannada remakes of Telugu films
Films shot in Iceland
Films scored by V. Harikrishna
2010s Kannada-language films